At least two warships of Japan have been named Takashio:

, an  launched in 1975 and struck in 1995
, an  launched in 2003

Japanese Navy ship names
Japan Maritime Self-Defense Force ship names